Varilla  is a genus of flowering plants in the family Asteraceae described as a genus in 1849.

The name Varilla is the Spanish word for "rod" or "wand." The genus is native to Texas and northern Mexico.

 Species
 Varilla mexicana A.Gray - Chihuahua, Coahuila, Durango, Zacatecas
 Varilla texana A.Gray - southern Texas, Tamaulipas, Nuevo León

References

Asteraceae genera
Taxa named by Asa Gray
Tageteae